Csaba Pálinkás (2 June 1959 – 11 October 2004) was a Hungarian cyclist. He competed in the team pursuit event at the 1980 Summer Olympics.

References

External links
 

1959 births
2004 deaths
Hungarian male cyclists
Olympic cyclists of Hungary
Cyclists at the 1980 Summer Olympics
People from Szekszárd
Sportspeople from Tolna County